Harunotsuji Site (also written as Haru-no-Tsuji) is an archaeological site of the Yayoi period that is located on Iki island in Nagasaki Prefecture, Japan. It was designated a national Special Historic Site. In addition, the artifacts excavated from this site have been designated national Important Cultural Properties.

References

See also
List of Historic Sites of Japan (Nagasaki)

Special Historic Sites
History of Nagasaki Prefecture
Yayoi period